Waffenamt (WaA) was the German Army Weapons Agency. It was the centre for research and development of the Weimar Republic and later the Third Reich for weapons, ammunition and army equipment to the German Reichswehr and then Wehrmacht. It was founded 8 November 1919 as Reichwaffenamt (RWA), and 5 May 1922 the name was changed to Heereswaffenamt (HWA).

The task of overseeing Germany's gigantic pre-World War II rearmament program was given to the Heeresabnahmestelle (the Army Acceptance Organization, commonly referred to as the Abnahme), a subsidiary of the Heereswaffenamt.

By 1940 the Abnahme consisted of 25,000 personnel in five departments in 16 inspection areas, augmented by specially selected plant personnel who were assigned to assist the Waffenamt inspectors in each manufacturing facility. Later, in the middle of 1944, approximately 8,000 of these Abnahme inspectors were "freed for service at the front".

The Heeres-Abnahmewesen was responsible for the testing and acceptance of all weapons, equipment and ammunition before delivery to the Wehrmacht. Inspections were carried out according to detailed guidelines called "Technische Lieferbedingungen" (TLs) prepared by the various Waffenprüfämter (WaPrüf) departments

When the rearmament program began, Waffenamt inspection departments were established in each factory and armourers were encouraged to apply for positions there. In preparation for their new duties they were given a four-week course at the Heereswaffenmeisterschule (Army Armourers School). The course ended with a test for Technical Inspector which raised the rank of each successful applicant to that of Oberleutnant (First Lieutenant). At the beginning of 1935, all inspection officials in the newly created program started on an equal footing as Technical Inspectors, but by the start of the war in 1939 nearly all of them had been promoted to Technical Inspector First Class with a rank of Hauptmann (Captain).

Waffenamt code (WaA) is the German inspection proof mark and can be found on firearms and equipment.

Chiefs of the Waffenamt

References 
 A Short History of the Heereswaffenamt

Research and development in Nazi Germany
German words and phrases
German High Command during World War II

Reichswehr
Military installations of the Wehrmacht
1919 establishments in Germany
1946 disestablishments in Germany